Carlos Arroyo Zapatero is a contemporary architect, urbanist and critic from Madrid, Spain. His work claims to set the frame for a new architectural culture, language and aesthetics, through the ethics, technology and parameters of sustainability.
He claims that his architecture is not designed to be photographed, but to be lived-in and enjoyed through time. He has developed a diagrammatic graphic style for his presentations which is inspirational for a whole generation of architects. In contrast, his built work is often portrayed by photographer-artists, producing innovative formats like photo-novellas, gif's, or video. 
His work has been exhibited in internationally renowned venues like the Venice Biennale (8th and 14th), the Institut Français d'Architecture, presented in referential publications like El Croquis, and quoted by many bloggers in the sphere.

Biography 
Carlos Arroyo was born on June 14, 1964. In 1990, after graduating in Linguistics at the Institute of Linguistics in London, he went back to Madrid where he studied Architecture at ETSAM and received ISOVER award for best PFC (Master Thesis Project) of the school in the year he graduated, 1997. He holds a PhD in Architecture since 2018. From 2000 to 2008 Arroyo was professor of Architectonic Projects at Universidad de Alcalá and since 2005 at Universidad Europea de Madrid  where he currently leads a Master Thesis Unit. He is honorary member of Europan Spain National Committee and member of Europan Europe Scientific Committee since 2004.

Awards 
Gold Prijs Bouwmeester 2013 awarded by the Government of Flanders to OostCampus, Oostkamp.
Archdaily's 65 Best New Buildings in the World 2012, Academie MWD
Archdaily's 65 Best New Buildings in the World 2012, OostCampus
Holcim Silver Award for Sustainable Construction in Europe 2011
Nominated for the European Union Mies van der Rohe Award 2011
International Competition Open Oproep for OostCampus. City Hall and Civic Centre. Belgium 1st prize 2008
International Competition Open Oproep for Academie MDW Academy of Performing Arts. Belgium 1st prize 2007
International Award; Sustainability and Innovation in Housing. EMVS. Madrid 2006
National Competition: Ferial y zonas recreativas. Vilanueva de la Cañada. Madrid 2nd prize 2004
International Saloni Award: Estudio y Refugio en Nuñez de Arce 2003
International Competition EUROPAN VI. Toledo Siet 1st prize 2001
Competition: Atico para Coleccionista en la calle de la Estrella de Madrid 1st prize 2001
National Competition: Pabellón “Franchipolis” para Deutsche Bank. Fira de Valencia1st prize 2000
National Competition: Centro de Día de Personas Mayores. Ayuntamiento de San Sebastian de los Reyes 2nd prize 2000
National Competition: Museo del Agua de Tenerife. Ayuntamiento de Guimar 1st prize 1999
Isover Award, best PFC (Thesis Project) of the year in ETSAM 1997

Main works

Architecture 
 OostCampus, Oostkamp, Belgium (Open Oproep)
 Academie MWD, Dilbeek, Belgium (Open Oproep)
 Casa MSA6, Madrid
 Edificio TSM3, Madrid
 Casa Encuentro, Tabernas, Almería
 Casa del Amor, Madrid
 Copropiedad CLV, Válor, Granada (EMVS awards for sustainability and residential innovation)
 Complejo AAN, Salamanca

Projects 
 119 houses at Rivas Ecopolis (ING Real Estate)

Urbanism 
 Eco-hood in Toledo, Toledo (Europan, 1st Prize)
 Ferial de Villanueva de la Cañada, Madrid (2nd Prize)

Bibliography

Books (selection) 
 Vivienda y sostenibilidad en España, Vol. 2 - Toni Solanas Ed. Gustavo Gili, Barcelona 2007
 Emergentes 06 – Ed. COAAragón, Zaragoza 2007
 Europan Generation. The reinterpreted City. - Ed. La cité de L´Architecture et du Patrimoine / Europan, Paris 2007
 Arquitecturas S.XXI - Ed. ea! Ediciones de arquitectura. Madrid 2007 - Págs.98-117
 Sostenibilidad y Tecnología en la Ciudad – Foro Civitas nova – Libro Verde - Ed. Fundación Civitas Nova. Albacete 2006
 Guía de Arquitectura de Madrid 1975-2007 -(AA.VV) Ed. EMVS Madrid 2006
 Vivienda en España - (AA.VV.) Ed. El Viso. Madrid 2006
 Freshmadrid - Ed. ea! Ediciones de arquitectura – db 10. Madrid 2006
 Catalogue of implementations. - Ed. Europan - Europe, Paris 2004
 Biennale di Venezia (Catalogo) Paisajes Internos. - Ed. Pabellón de España. Madrid 2002

Periodicals (selection) 
 A+, Nº 216 (2009) - Brussel
 Minerva, Nº IV
 El Croquis, Nº 119 Madrid (2004); Nº 136/137 Madrid (2007).
 Arquitectos - Nº 181 (2007) - Madrid.
 Pasajes, Nº 94 (2008); 25 (2007) - Madrid.
 Arquitectura, Nº: 326 (2002) 344 (2006) - Madrid.
 InfoDOMUS, Nº 1 (2006) - Madrid.
 EPS – El País Semanal. Madrid, 2004

External links 
Carlos Arroyo@Studio Banana
Carlos Arroyo Website  Spanish English
NIB Top 10 English
Freshmadrid English
photos of his office in Madrid, by photographer-artist Amparo Garrido
Academy for Music, Word and Dance Dutch

References 

Spanish architects
Living people
Architects from Madrid
1964 births
Polytechnic University of Madrid alumni